George E. Norcross III (born March 16, 1956) is an American businessman and a Democratic Party organizer and power broker in southern  New Jersey.

Norcross is executive chairman of Conner Strong & Buckelew, an insurance brokerage firm. He is chairman of the board of trustees for Cooper University Health Care System and Cooper University Hospital both in Camden, New Jersey, and has served as a trustee since 1990. He led the effort to create the Cooper Medical School of Rowan University and to partner with MD Anderson Cancer Center to create the MD Anderson Cooper Cancer Center, which opened in 2013.

Norcross has been a prominent political leader in New Jersey for more than 30 years, since before he became chairman of the Camden County Democratic Committee in 1989, a position he held until 1993. For many years, he has been named one of the most powerful non-elected political figures in New Jersey by the website PolitickerNJ.com. From 2014 through 2021, he was named one of New Jersey's most powerful people by NJBiz.com. He is regarded as New Jersey's most powerful unelected leader.

Norcross is a member of the Democratic National Committee. He formerly belonged to Mar-a-Lago, the club owned by former United States President Donald Trump.

Early life
Norcross was born on March 16, 1956, in Cooper University Hospital, Camden, New Jersey, the son of George E. Norcross, Jr., the president of the AFL–CIO Central Labor Union of Camden and Gloucester Counties, and his wife, Anne Carol Norcross.

Norcross Jr. was active in the community of Camden and a board member of Cooper University Hospital. He served on the board of and was the chairman of United Way. His mother died at the age of 84 in 2016. She was remembered as "a tireless advocate for senior citizens."

Norcross graduated from Pennsauken High School and briefly attended Rutgers University–Camden. He has three brothers: Donald, a United States Congressman representing New Jersey's 1st congressional district; Philip, managing partner of the law firm Parker McCay; and John, a psychologist, author, and professor at the University of Scranton.

Career

Insurance
Norcross is the executive chairman of insurance, risk management and employee benefits brokerage and consulting firm Conner Strong & Buckelew, where he has worked since 1979. Norcross was named the second most powerful man in the New Jersey business world by NJBiz.com in 2014, 2015, and 2016, and made the list's top ten list in 2017, 2018, 2019, 2020 and 2021. In September 2015, Norcross was announced as one of the local investors in The Camden Waterfront, a $1 billion development on Camden's waterfront initially developed by Liberty Property Trust and designed by Robert A.M. Stern. Norcross said he would invest $50 million in the project, and in March 2017, Norcross announced his company would move to the Camden waterfront as part of a $245 million development. The 18-story, 394,164 square-foot building also houses The Michaels Organization, NFI, and two new restaurants spearheaded by Philadelphia celebrity chef Michael Schulson.

Cooper University Health Care System
Norcross is Chairman of the Board of Trustees of the Cooper University Health Care System , Cooper University Hospital and the MD Anderson Cancer Center at Cooper, in Camden, New Jersey.  He has served as a Cooper trustee since 1990. Norcross launched the Cooper Medical School of Rowan University, which New Jersey Assembly Speaker Joseph Roberts praised for its "unflagging commitment to the city," and helped to facilitate the opening of the MD Anderson Cooper Cancer Center in October 2013.

In the wake of the Veterans Health Administration scandal of 2014, Cooper announced a "Veterans VIP Priority Program" that provided day care to veterans in New Jersey's seven southern counties. In November 2014, Cooper and Norcross were awarded the "Seven Seals" award by the Employer Support of the Guard and Reserve in recognition of the program.

In February 2012, Norcross penned an op-ed in the Courier-Post that called for the merger of Rowan University and Rutgers-Camden, positing it could be a "catalyst for the kind of renaissance that could make South Jersey an epicenter of intellectual and economic success for decades." In June that year, the state approved the partnership.

Criticism
The office of the Attorney General of New Jersey and the United States Attorney's office under Chris Christie investigated Norcross after he was secretly taped discussing state politics. After thorough investigations and significant media coverage, he was not charged. Norcross was also the subject of a federal investigation in 2016 where his phones were wiretapped. The United States Attorney's Office for New Jersey sent Norcross a letter confirming that no action was warranted and the investigation was closed.

Norcross has been associated with businesses that are alleged to have received special treatment from the New Jersey Economic Development Authority.

An investigative task force was formed to look into the operations and procedures of the EDA. Norcross sued the State of New Jersey to try stop the highly critical report from becoming public. After a five-hour court hearing about the injunction, Norcross lost and within minutes, the report was made public.

Personal life
Norcross has a daughter, Lexie, and a son, Alex.

Norcross was listed as one of the state's wealthiest people, ranked 41st in New Jersey in 2015 with a net worth of almost $250 million.

References

External links
Senatorial suspense on the CBT and arena, PoliticsNJ.com, July 2012; accessed December 22, 2014.
Fast-Growing Commerce Bancorp Counts On Political Ties, w4.stern.nyu.edu, May 21, 2003; accessed December 22, 2014.
Engle, Bob & McClure, Sandy (2008), The Soprano State: New Jersey's Culture of Corruption, St. Martin's Press, New York.
"They Have No Choice", phillymag.com; accessed December 22, 2014.

1956 births
Living people
American bankers
American chief executives
People from Cherry Hill, New Jersey
Politicians from Camden, New Jersey
Commerce Bancorp
New Jersey Democrats
American political bosses from New Jersey
Pennsauken High School alumni